Nepa (also known as Nipa, Neepa) was a mountainous kingdom mentioned in the ancient Sanskrit epic Mahabharata. Its modern equivalent is identified as the Kingdom of Nepal, a country located in the mountainous terrain of the Himalayas.

References in Mahabharata

Nepas and king Yudhishthira 
Nepas were mentioned as a tribe who were under the sway of Pandava king Yudhishthira:-  The Nipas, the Chitrakas, the Kukkuras, the Karaskaras, and the Lauha-janghas are living in the palace of Yudhishthira like bondsmen (MBh 2:49). Nepas gave tribute to Yudhishthira during his Rajasuya sacrifice:- Numberless Chinas and Sakas and Uddras and many barbarous tribes living in the woods, and many Vrishnis and Harahunas, and dusky tribes of the Himavat, and many Nipas and people residing in regions on the sea-coast, waited with tribute at the gate (of king Yudhishthira) (2:5).

Bhima's list of kings 
Nepa king is mentioned in a list of kings whose acts lead to the destruction of their own race, much like the case of Duryodhana, whose acts lead to the destruction of the Kuru race.

When Dharma became extinct, Kali was born in the race of Asuras flourishing with prosperity and blazing with energy, so was born Udavarta among the Haihayas. Janamejaya among the Nepas, Vahula among the Talajanghas, proud Vasu among the Krimis, Ajavindu among the Suviras, Rushardhik among the Surashtras, Arkaja among the Valihas, Dhautamulaka among the Chinas, Hayagriva among the Videhas, Varayu among the Mahaujasas, Vahu among the Sundaras, Pururavas among the Diptakshas, Sahaja among the Chedis and Matsyas, Vrishaddhaja among the Praviras, Dharana among the Chandra-batsyas, Bigahana among the Mukutas and Sama among the Nandivegas (5:74).

Other References 
At (13:34) we found the following passage where Nepas are mentioned as Nipas:- The Bhrigus conquered the Talajanghas. The son of Angiras conquered the Nipas. Bharadwaja conquered the Vitahavyas as also the Ailas.

See also 
Kingdoms of Ancient India

References 
Mahabharata of Krishna Dwaipayana Vyasa, translated to English by Kisari Mohan Ganguli

External links

Kingdoms in the Mahabharata
History of Nepal